Guido Romano (31 January 1888 – 18 June 1916) was an Italian gymnast who competed in the 1908 Summer Olympics and in the 1912 Summer Olympics. He was born in Modena and died during World War I when killed at the Battle of Asiago as an infantryman in the Italian army. In 1908 he competed in the individual all-around and finished 19th. He was also part of the Italian team, which was able to win the gold medal in the gymnastics men's team, European system event in 1912.

References

External links
profile

1888 births
1916 deaths
Sportspeople from Modena
Italian male artistic gymnasts
Gymnasts at the 1908 Summer Olympics
Gymnasts at the 1912 Summer Olympics
Olympic gymnasts of Italy
Olympic gold medalists for Italy
Olympic medalists in gymnastics
Medalists at the 1912 Summer Olympics
Italian military personnel killed in World War I